Bruno Pereira Mendes (born 2 August 1994), known as Bruno Mendes, is a Brazilian professional footballer who plays as a striker for Guarani, on loan from Deportivo Maldonado.

Club career
Bruno Mendes was born in Cruzeiro, São Paulo, and joined Guarani's youth setup in 2007, aged 12. On 21 January 2012, aged just 17, he made his first team debut by coming on as a second-half substitute in a 2–1 Campeonato Paulista home win against Oeste.

Bruno Mendes scored his first senior goal on 17 March 2012, netting the first in a 2–0 home defeat of Mirassol. He immediately became a starter for the side, scoring four goals in 18 appearances as his side reached the finals but lost to Santos.

In September 2012, Bruno Mendes signed for Botafogo until the end of the following year. Bought outright by HAZ Sport Agency from Guarani for a R$7 million fee, HAZ used Macaé as a proxy to register Bruno Mendes's registration rights. He made his debut for the club on 30 September, replacing Clarence Seedorf late into a 2–0 away loss against Bahia for the Série A championship.

Bruno Mendes scored his first goal for Bota on 14 October 2012, netting the equalizer in a 1–1 away draw against Grêmio. Five days later he scored a brace in a 3–2 home win against Vasco da Gama, and finished the month with five goals in six matches.

In November 2012, former Guarani player Andrei Frascarelli claimed the club owed him wages and asked the court to grant the rights of Bruno Mendes to him. Eventually Macaé assumed the debt, and paid Andrei R$580,000 to settle the case.

On 15 July 2015, Mendes signed with Portuguese Primeira Liga side Vitória de Guimarães.

Career statistics

Honours

Club
Botafogo
Campeonato Carioca: 2013

Guarani
Campeonato Paulista Série A2: 2018

International
Brazil U20
 8 Nations Football Challenge: 2012

References

External links
 

Profile at Cerezo Osaka

1994 births
People from Cruzeiro, São Paulo
Living people
Brazilian footballers
Association football forwards
Brazil youth international footballers
Guarani FC players
Botafogo de Futebol e Regatas players
Club Athletico Paranaense players
Avaí FC players
Deportivo Maldonado players
Vitória S.C. players
Vitória S.C. B players
Cerezo Osaka players
Avispa Fukuoka players
Campeonato Brasileiro Série A players
Campeonato Brasileiro Série B players
Primeira Liga players
Liga Portugal 2 players
J1 League players
Brazilian expatriate sportspeople in Portugal
Brazilian expatriate sportspeople in Uruguay
Brazilian expatriate sportspeople in Japan
Expatriate footballers in Portugal
Expatriate footballers in Uruguay
Expatriate footballers in Japan